Kittisiri Meghavanna was King of Anuradhapura in the 6th century, whose reign lasted from 560 to 561. He succeeded his father Moggallana II as King of Anuradhapura and was succeeded by Maha Naga.

See also
 List of Sri Lankan monarchs
 History of Sri Lanka

References

External links
 Kings & Rulers of Sri Lanka
 Codrington's Short History of Ceylon

Monarchs of Anuradhapura
K
K
K